In Taoism, the Five Precepts constitute the basic code of ethics undertaken mainly by lay practitioners. For monks and nuns, there are more advanced and stricter precepts. The Five Precepts are nearly the same as the Five Precepts of Buddhism; however, there are minor differences to fit in with Chinese society.

 The first precept: No Killing;
 The second precept: No Stealing;
 The third precept: No Sexual Misconduct;
 The fourth precept: No False Speech;
 The fifth precept: No Taking of Intoxicants.

Their definitions can be found in an excerpt of :

See also
 Ten Precepts (Taoism)

Notes

References

 /B.054

Chinese philosophy
Taoist philosophy
Taoist ethics
Codes of conduct
Cultural lists